Digeh Sara (also Romanized as Dīgeh Sarā; also known as Dal‘eh Sarāi, Darkhāneh, Degah Sarāi, Degakh-Saray, Dekeh Sarā, Dīgeh Sarā-ye Pā’īn, and Dīkeh Sarā) is a village in Khaleh Sara Rural District, Asalem District, Talesh County, Gilan Province, Iran. At the 2006 census, its population was 624, in 140 families.

References 

Populated places in Talesh County